Several political parties operate in Aosta Valley, Italy. No one party has ever had the chance of gaining power alone and thus parties must work with each other to form  coalition governments. The Valdostan Union has long been the region's largest, but has lost most of its support over the last decade and in the 2020 regional election it came second after Northern League Aosta Valley.

2020 regional election

Regionalist parties
Several regionalist parties operate in Aosta Valley. This is a list of current and former regionalist parties, having garnered at least 3% of the vote.

Current parties
Northern League Aosta Valley (Lega Nord Valle d'Aosta), including:
Young Aosta Valley (Giovane Valle d'Aosta)
Valdostan Union (Union Valdôtaine)
Civic Network (Rete Civica)
Valdostan Alliance (Alliance Valdôtaine)
Progressive Valdostan Union (Union Valdôtaine Progressiste)
Autonomy Liberty Participation Ecology (Autonomie, Liberté, Participation, Ecologie)
Edelweiss (Stella Alpina)
Mouv' (Mouv''')
For the Autonomy (Per l'Autonomia)

Former parties
Aosta Valley Regional Rally (Raggruppamento Regionale Valle d'Aosta)
Italian Democratic Group (Gruppo Democratico Italiano)
Valdostan Rally (Rassemblement Valdôtain)
Valdostan Democratic Union (Union Democratique Valdôtaine)
Progressive Valdostan Union (1973) (Union Valdôtaine Progressiste)
Valdostan Craftsmen and Traders (Artigiani e Commercianti Valdostani)
Popular Democrats (Democratici Popolari)
Free Zone List (Lista Zona Franca)
Autonomist Union (Union Autonomiste)
Progressive Democratic Autonomists (Autonomistes Démocrates Progressistes)
Independent Autonomists (Autonomisti Indipendenti)
For Aosta Valley (Pour la Vallée d'Aoste)
Autonomist People's Alliance (Alleanza Popolare Autonomista)
Autonomists (Autonomistes)
Forward Valley (Alé Vallée)
Alternative Greens (Verdi Alternativi)
Valdostan Renewal (Renouveau valdôtain)
Lively Aosta Valley (Vallée d'Aoste vive)
Valdostan Independentists (Indépendantistes Valdôtains)
Autonomist Federation (Fédération autonomiste)
For Our Valley (Pour Notre Vallée)
Valdostan Autonomist Popular Edelweiss (Edelweiss Popolare Autonomista Valdostano)
New Aosta Valley (Nuova Valle d'Aosta'')

See also
List of political parties in Italy

 
Aosta Valley